The Year of the Mouse is a 1965 Tom and Jerry short directed and produced by Chuck Jones, with a story by Jones and Michael Maltese and animation by Dick Thompson, Ben Washam, Ken Harris, and Don Towsley.

Plot
Whilst Tom is sleeping, Jerry and Nipper, standing on a chimney top, decide to play mean tricks on Tom. Nipper uses a fishing line to lower Jerry to the bottom of the chimney. Jerry hits Tom with a fly swatter, leaving it in Tom's hand, and Nibbles quickly reels him in, making Tom believe that he hit himself in his sleep. Tom goes back to sleep without thinking of it anymore.

Later, Jerry is lowered down the chimney holding a revolver. Jerry places the gun in Tom's hand while he's asleep and has a string tied to its trigger. As Jerry is reeled up, he pulls the string to the gun's trigger, firing the gun and waking Tom up, who is surprised to think he shot at himself in his sleep. Panicking at this, he attempts to get rid of the gun, setting it off and creating a long scar on his head. Unable to figure it out, he just goes back to sleep. But as he does, the mice pull off their next trick. They drill a hole through the ceiling and lower a noose on Tom. Tom wakes up and looks around, getting the noose around his neck. Just as he goes back to sleep, the mice lower the other end of the rope onto Tom's hand, which he takes notice. He peers at the rope on the chandelier and then he tugs it extremely twice and it extremely pulls his neck. He quickly panics as he gets the noose off of his head, but after he gets it off, the chandelier unexpectedly unscrews itself from the ceiling and it falls right on top of Tom's head. Tom then gives a quick laugh before he faints and falls flat on his back.

The two mice prepare their next trick. As Tom is going back to sleep, the mice place a knife in his hands. Then Jerry opens a bottle of ketchup and pours some onto the end of the knife and then some onto Tom's chest. When Tom wakes up, he sees the stained knife in his hand and thinks that the knife is covered in blood, so he panics and leans against the wall. Then he clenches his chest and sees ketchup on his hand. Thinking that it's blood, he quickly concludes that he had stabbed himself in his sleep. Tom rushes into the bathroom and grabs a tourniquet, which he uses to tighten his neck. When he does, he inflates himself like a balloon and floats up onto the ceiling. As he does, he floats out of the bathroom and back in the living room where he notices the bottle of ketchup on the table. Then he tastes the ketchup on his chest and realizes it's a trick and starts laughing, but as he does, the tourniquet loosens and he starts to deflate, flying around the room until he lands on his pillow.

As Jerry makes fun of Tom's predicament, Nipper notices a bow and arrow on the ground. This time, they set Tom inside the bow as he is asleep. After Jerry signals Nipper to pull him back up, Tom stretches, which stretches the bow and causes it to launch him through the hallway, crashing through a vent in the wall, down a pipe, into the furnace, getting Tom launched through another pipe and then out the stovepipe chimney on the roof. The two mice watch Tom as he flies in the air and down the chimney they are standing on. Then they look down the chimney to see the aftermath of their latest prank. However, Tom sees the two mice and furiously points the gun straight at them, meaning that he has had enough of their tricks.

Later, Jerry and Nipper are trapped in a bottle with the revolver facing them. If they remove the cork to get out, it will pull a string which the other end is tied to the trigger of the gun, and they would be killed or injured by the gunshot. Jerry and Nibbles can only sit there and sulk furiously at their predicament while Tom, basking in unexpected victory, takes his peace and quiet nap, using his tail to cool himself off with a fan.

Crew
Story: Michael Maltese & Chuck Jones
Animation: Dick Thompson, Ben Washam, Ken Harris & Don Towsley
Backgrounds: Philip DeGuard
Vocal Effects: Mel Blanc & June Foray
In Charge of Production: Les Goldman
Co-Director & Layouts: Maurice Noble
Music: Eugene Poddany
Produced & Directed by Chuck Jones

Production notes
The Year of the Mouse is a remake of Jones' Oscar Nominated Mouse Wreckers with Claude Cat and Hubie and Bertie. This is one of the fewest shorts in which Tom wins against Jerry (given that tables turned).

External links
The Year of the Mouse at The Big Cartoon DataBase

References

1965 animated films
1965 short films
1965 films
1960s animated short films
Tom and Jerry short films
Short films directed by Chuck Jones
Films directed by Maurice Noble
Films scored by Eugene Poddany
1960s American animated films
Animated films without speech
1965 comedy films
Metro-Goldwyn-Mayer short films
Metro-Goldwyn-Mayer animated short films
MGM Animation/Visual Arts short films
Films with screenplays by Michael Maltese
1960s English-language films